Sulzeer Jeremiah Campbell  (born 18 September 1974) is an English professional football manager and former player who was most recently the manager of  club Southend United. He previously managed Macclesfield Town from November 2018 to August 2019. A centre-back, he spent 20 years playing in the Premier League and had an 11-year international career with the England national team.

Born in East London to Jamaican parents, Campbell began his career with Tottenham Hotspur in December 1992. He spent nine years at Spurs, scoring 10 goals in 255 appearances, and captaining the team to victory in the 1999 Football League Cup Final against Leicester City. In 2001, he joined Tottenham's North London rivals Arsenal on a free transfer, and as a result has remained a deeply unpopular figure amongst Spurs supporters. In his five years and 195 appearances at Arsenal, he won two Premier League winners medals and two FA Cup winners medals, encompassing the 2001–02 league and FA Cup double, and being part of the team that became known as The Invincibles for their undefeated 2003–04 Premier League campaign. He scored Arsenal's only goal in their 2–1 defeat to Barcelona in the 2006 UEFA Champions League Final. In August 2006, he joined Portsmouth on a free transfer. His three years with the club included captaining them to victory in the 2008 FA Cup Final. At the end of the 2008–09 season, he made the surprise move of dropping down three levels of the English football pyramid to join League Two side Notts County on a free transfer. He left the club by mutual consent in September 2009, having played just one match for the club. The next year, he made a brief return to Arsenal before ending his career with Newcastle United.

Having already won caps for the England under-21s and England B team, Campbell gained his first of 73 full caps for England aged 21. In May 1998, Campbell became what was then England's second-youngest captain, after Bobby Moore, aged 23 years 248 days. In 2006, he became the only player to have represented England in six consecutive major tournaments, playing in the 1996, 2000 and 2004 UEFA European Championships; and the 1998, 2002 and 2006 FIFA World Cups. He was named in the Teams of the Tournament for the 2002 World Cup and at Euro 2004. Other honours in the game include being in the PFA Team of the Year three times, in 1999, 2003 and 2004.

In February 2015, Campbell announced his ambition to be the Conservative Party candidate for Mayor of London in the 2016 election, but he was not shortlisted.

Early life
Campbell was born in Plaistow, London, to Jamaican parents Sewell and Wihelmina. He was the youngest of twelve children, nine of whom were boys. His father was a railway worker and his mother, Wihelmina, was a Ford factory worker. Despite growing up in a rough neighbourhood in a family with very little money, Campbell veered away from a life of crime due to his strict parents.

Campbell attended the Portway Primary School in Plaistow, London and had secondary education at Lister Community School in Plaistow, London. He was a prodigious schoolboy talent and was part-educated at the FA's School of Excellence at Lilleshall, where he met table tennis player and later football agent Sky Andrew. Campbell had a short spell at West Ham United, beginning his career as a striker. He left the Youth programme at Upton Park after a coach joked to him that Campbell would be pleased to hear that the West Indies were beating England at cricket; Campbell took this to be offensive.

Club career

Tottenham Hotspur
Following his experience at West Ham United, Campbell was reluctant to join another professional club's youth programme, but after two months of persistence from Tottenham Hotspur's chief scout Len Cheesewright, he eventually joined the Tottenham Youth team. Youth team manager Keith Waldon later recalled that it was his physicality rather than his technical ability which made him stand out as a good prospect for the future. At age 14, he was one of only 16 young footballers accepted onto a training programme at Lilleshall Hall. Waldon offered to make him captain of the youth team, but Campbell declined the offer as he wanted to concentrate on his own game.

Campbell made his first team debut for Spurs on 5 December 1992 against Chelsea at White Hart Lane, scoring the goal in a 2–1 defeat after coming on as a substitute for Nick Barmby. Despite this start to his career, he was not picked by manager Terry Venables again throughout the remainder of the 1992–93 season.

New boss Osvaldo Ardiles played him at left back at the start of the 1993–94 season in place of the injured Justin Edinburgh, before he was switched to right back in place of Dean Austin. At the end of the season, he signed a four-year contract with the club.

New manager Gerry Francis led the club to the semi-finals of the FA Cup in the 1994–95 campaign, but Campbell missed the match due to injury and Spurs were beaten by Everton. Campbell continued to progress in his performances, but Spurs struggled to mid-table league finishes in the 1995–96 and 1996–97 seasons. Francis appointed Campbell as club captain, taking over the role from the out of favour David Howells. He had a strained relationship with short-lived manager Christian Gross during the 1997–98 season as Spurs again struggled. Gross's replacement, George Graham, also had a difficult relationship with Campbell.

Campbell successfully captained his side to a League Cup final win over Leicester City in the 1998–99 season. This made him the first black captain to lift a major trophy at Wembley Stadium. He was also named on the PFA Team of the Year, as was teammate David Ginola.

The League Cup success qualified Spurs to compete in the UEFA Cup during the 1999–2000 campaign, but they only made it into the Second Round before they were beaten by German side 1. FC Kaiserslautern. During this time, he was falsely accused of breaking a stewards arm during a scuffle in a game at Derby County, and refused Tottenham's lawyer's advice to have the case Bound over (meaning he would not be convicted but would effectively have admitted some level of wrongdoing), and was subsequently told by the club to field his own legal defence for the case. The case was later dismissed. The club's lack of progress in the league, his poor relationship with recent managers and the club's lack of support during the assault case left Campbell feeling disillusioned with Spurs.

Campbell missed three months of the 2000–01 campaign after dislocating his shoulder in a 0–0 League Cup draw with Brentford at Griffin Park. He made his final appearance for the club in the FA Cup semi-final defeat to Arsenal at Old Trafford. Manager Glenn Hoddle admitted it was a risk to play Campbell as the defender was not at full fitness, and he injured his ankle fouling Ray Parlour before he was eventually replaced by Ledley King. However, before the substitution could be made, Patrick Vieira scored a header for Arsenal while Campbell was off the pitch receiving treatment.

In the summer of 2001, Campbell's contract expired. Mindful of the Bosman ruling and what happened with Steve McManaman (Britain's first high-profile Bosman related transfer), Tottenham offered him a contract which would have made him the club's highest-ever paid player, but after months of negotiations and several public assurances he would stay at Spurs, Campbell stated his need to leave the club in order to play UEFA Champions League football, with the likes of England manager Sven-Göran Eriksson advising him of such a course. Several top continental clubs expressed interest in signing him, but he joined Arsenal – Tottenham's biggest rivals – on a free transfer. Campbell had previously stated in an interview with Spurs Monthly magazine that he would never play for Arsenal. The move was also unusual as no rumours of a move to Arsenal had been leaked or speculated upon in the media before the press conference revealing his decision, and many journalists in attendance had been led to believe they were there to witness the unveiling of goalkeeper Richard Wright, which would have been a routine sports news story.

Campbell has been labelled "Judas" by some Spurs supporters. Years later, the anger from Spurs supporters remained. In January 2009, four Tottenham fans were banned from every football ground in England and Wales for three years after being found guilty of chanting an offensive song containing indecent language (with homophobic content and content which some observers interpreted as racist) aimed at Campbell.

Arsenal

Arsène Wenger later said he signed Campbell as he found that when playing against him, his attackers could not pass him like they could other players and that "it was as if he was indestructible, such a power spread from him". He made his debut for the Gunners on 18 August – the opening day of the 2001–02 Premier League season, in a 4–0 win over Middlesbrough at the Riverside Stadium. During the season, Campbell was partnered at the back by either Tony Adams (who would retire at the end of the season) or Martin Keown. He made a return to White Hart Lane during a 1–1 draw on 17 November, and though he played well, he was shocked to see his older brother Tony in the crowd supporting Spurs as the fans shouted insults out to Campbell on the pitch. Campbell enjoyed immediate success with Arsenal, as he won both Premier League and FA Cup winners' medals as Arsenal won the Double in his first season at Highbury. In the FA Cup final at the Millennium Stadium on 4 May, he played alongside Adams as the team kept a clean sheet in a 2–0 victory over Chelsea. Four days later, they secured the league title with a 1–0 victory over Manchester United at Old Trafford.

The 2002–03 season saw Arsenal exit the Champions League at the group stage, but remained on course for a retention of the Double as they reached the final of the FA Cup. However, he missed the end-of-season run-in due to suspension after referee Mark Halsey gave him a straight red card for an alleged elbow on Manchester United's Ole Gunnar Solskjær. The club appealed the suspension but were unsuccessful, and he was forced to miss the cup final as Arsenal defeated Southampton to retain the trophy, though they ended the league campaign in second place. His performances were recognised with a place on the PFA Team of the Year, alongside teammates Lauren, Ashley Cole, Patrick Vieira, Robert Pires and Thierry Henry.

The following season, 2003–04, would be known as "The Invincibles season" as Campbell formed a new partnership with Kolo Touré, with the pair instrumental in helping Arsenal regain the Premier League title without losing a single match. The title was secured with a 2–2 draw with Spurs at White Hart Lane on 25 April. He was named on the PFA Team of the Year for the third time in his career, alongside teammates Lauren, Cole, Vieira, Pires and Henry.

Campbell missed the start of the 2004–05 season with a knee injury, and so missed the 2004 FA Community Shield victory over Manchester United. The unbeaten run continued to a record 49 matches before Manchester United defeated them 2–0 at Old Trafford on 24 October in a match that would become known as the "Battle of the Buffet". Referee Mike Riley gave a penalty after Campbell challenged Wayne Rooney, though Campbell would maintain that the young striker had taken a dive. Towards the end of the campaign, Wenger began playing Kolo Touré and one of Pascal Cygan and Philippe Senderos in central defence, and Campbell was benched, leaving him to complain to the manager that Senderos was a "lucky player" who should not be considered good enough to play at Campbell's expense. Arsenal again finished second in the league and won the FA Cup final at Manchester United's expense, though Campbell was an unused substitute in the match.

In the 2005–06 season, Campbell was blighted both with injuries and a loss of form. In Arsenal's 3–2 home loss to West Ham United on 1 February, Campbell was largely responsible for West Ham's first two goals before being substituted at half-time at his own request. Unusually, he then left the stadium, not staying to watch the second half. His teammate Robert Pires commented that Campbell was facing a "big worry" in relation to his private life, and Campbell did not make any contact with the club for several days. He left the country and spent a week with a friend in Brussels as he reflected on his life. He resumed training with his teammates on 6 February.

Campbell was back playing on 25 April in the second leg of the UEFA Champions League semi-final against Villarreal in Spain, where a 0–0 draw on the night put the Gunners into the final. In the final against Barcelona at the Stade de France, Paris, Campbell scored the opening goal, a header from a free-kick taken from Henry after a foul on Emmanuel Eboué. However, ten-man Arsenal went on to lose 2–1, although Campbell was at least involved in the best defensive run of any team in the history of the competition, with opponents failing to score against Arsenal in ten consecutive matches and a total of 995 minutes. Campbell also holds the distinction, alongside Teddy Sheringham, Steve McManaman, Steven Gerrard, Frank Lampard and Wayne Rooney, as one of six Englishmen to have scored in a Champions League final. In July 2006, Campbell left Arsenal by mutual consent in order to seek "a fresh challenge".

Portsmouth

Campbell was courted by Italian club Juventus, but manager Didier Deschamps eventually ended contract negotiations. Campbell then rejected an approach from Turkish side Fenerbahçe. Instead, he remained in England and joined Premier League club Portsmouth, signing a two-year contract in August 2006. His time at Pompey started well, as he formed a successful partnership in the centre of defence with Linvoy Primus and helped the club to keep five consecutive clean sheets. He scored his first goal for the club in a 3–1 win over Sheffield United on 23 December.

He was named as captain for the 2007–08 season by manager Harry Redknapp, and signed a new two-year contract with the club. He captained the club to a 1–0 win over Cardiff City at Wembley Stadium in the 2008 FA Cup Final.

The club went into severe financial difficulties, and Redknapp resigned, but Campbell stayed and helped the club to avoid relegation in the 2008–09 campaign. In January 2010, Campbell sued Portsmouth for £1.7 million in unpaid image rights and bonus payments.

Notts County
Campbell signed a five-year deal with League Two side Notts County in August 2009. Campbell said that County, who had recently been the subject of a takeover by a Middle Eastern consortium, were the best club for "where I am at the moment in my life", and that the recent appointment of ex-England manager Sven-Göran Eriksson as director of football played a "big role" in his decision. He made his debut for County in a 2–1 defeat to Morecambe at Christie Park on 19 September. He walked out on the club three days later, and his contract was cancelled by mutual consent on 24 September. He later admitted he felt embarrassed and that "I was being a mug" in believing the club's owners were ambitious billionaires who intended to take the club into the Premier League.

Return to Arsenal

Campbell began training with the Arsenal side in mid-October 2009 in a bid to maintain his fitness ahead of the January transfer window. On 15 January, he re-signed with the club. It was announced he would wear the number 31 shirt. Nine days later, he made his second debut for the Gunners in an FA Cup defeat to Stoke City. On 18 February, he scored his first goal in his second stint at the club with a headed goal against Porto in the first leg of the UEFA Champions League round of 16. Due to injuries to Thomas Vermaelen and William Gallas towards the end of the season, he found himself starting frequently for Arsenal.

Newcastle United

In July 2010, after turning down an offer of a two-year contract with Scottish club Celtic, Campbell joined Newcastle United on a one-year contract. He made his first appearance for the Magpies in a League Cup win over Chelsea on 22 September. On 3 October, he made his Premier League debut for the club as a 38th-minute substitute for Fabricio Coloccini in a 2–1 defeat to Manchester City at the City of Manchester Stadium. In doing so, he became only the second player after Ryan Giggs to play in the first 19 seasons of the Premier League. On 28 November, Campbell made his first Premier League start for Newcastle against Chelsea, and was given the captain's armband after Shola Ameobi was substituted. Campbell started again in Newcastle's next two fixtures with West Bromwich Albion and Liverpool, but lost his place upon the return of Coloccini. After a long period out with viruses, Campbell returned to bench duty in January, making his first appearance in two months as a substitute in Newcastle's 2–0 win over Birmingham City on 15 February.

In May 2011, manager Alan Pardew announced Campbell was a free agent after the club opted not to renew his contract. Campbell announced his retirement from football a year later in May 2012.

International career
Campbell was a regular through the various England youth teams, and picked up two man of the match awards during the 1993 UEFA European Under-19 Championship which England won with a 1–0 win over Turkey.

Campbell made his international debut as a substitute against Hungary on 18 May 1996. Although he had only one cap by the time Terry Venables selected his squad for UEFA Euro 1996, Campbell made the squad as defensive cover. He won his second cap in England's 2–0 group stage match against Scotland, again as a substitute.

Over the next two years, under new manager Glenn Hoddle, Campbell became a regular member of England's defence, partnering Gareth Southgate and Tony Adams. On 29 May 1998, aged 23 years and 248 days, Campbell became England's second-youngest captain after Bobby Moore in a 0–0 draw against Belgium, though Michael Owen subsequently overtook Campbell after captaining England against Paraguay in April 2002. Campbell started all four of England's matches in the 1998 World Cup.

During the 1998 World Cup, Campbell was involved in a highly controversial incident in England's second round clash against Argentina. With less than ten minutes to play, the score was 2–2 and England were down to ten men after David Beckham was sent off. Campbell headed a corner into the Argentine net and wheeled away to celebrate his first international goal, which appeared to be the winning goal which would have put England into the quarter finals. However, the referee disallowed the goal after ruling that Alan Shearer had illegally contacted the goalkeeper, and England eventually lost the match on penalties.

Campbell was England's first-choice centre back throughout the successful qualification campaign for Euro 2000 under new boss Kevin Keegan, and played in all three group games at the tournament, which England exited after defeat by Romania.

After the retirement of Tony Adams, Campbell partnered Rio Ferdinand in England's successful qualification campaign for the 2002 World Cup, held in Korea and Japan. He scored his only senior international goal at the tournament, a header off a corner kick by Beckham in the opening group game against Sweden. The match ended 1–1, but in their next match, England defeated Argentina 1–0. Campbell's partnership with Ferdinand was an integral part of a strong defensive performance throughout the tournament, and he was the only England player to be named in the FIFA World Cup All-Star Team. England progressed to the quarter-finals, where they lost to eventual winners Brazil despite playing the last 30 minutes against ten men.

Campbell maintained his place in the centre of defence as he took part in England's successful qualification campaign for Euro 2004. England went on to reach the quarter-finals clash with hosts Portugal, and with the score tied at 1–1, Campbell won a header in the opposition six-yard box to score what seemed to be a late winner for England. However, referee Urs Meier decided that John Terry had pushed Portuguese goalkeeper Ricardo and instead gave a free-kick. The game ended 2–2 after extra time, and England lost the penalty shoot-out.

Campbell continued to play for England after Euro 2004, although his place in the international team had become less secure since the emergence of the central defensive partnership of Terry and Ferdinand, which blossomed during Campbell's period of absence with injury in 2005. He was named in England's squad for the 2006 World Cup, but was third-choice centre back, with coach Sven-Göran Eriksson preferring the partnership of Ferdinand and Terry. However, after a knock to Ferdinand, Campbell came on as a substitute in England's group match against Sweden, which made him the first player to represent England on the pitch at six consecutive international tournaments. After Eriksson's resignation, new coach Steve McClaren chose to look elsewhere for central defensive strength and Campbell was dropped for his first match in charge against Greece in August 2006.

After injuries to Ledley King, Jonathan Woodgate and Michael Dawson, along with Jamie Carragher retiring from international football, Campbell was recalled to the national team. He played four matches under McClaren as England's qualification campaign failed.

New head coach Fabio Capello did not select Campbell for his first squad in January 2008. Campbell enjoyed a fine run of form on his return to Arsenal and had retained hope of making it to England's squad for the 2010 World Cup, which would have been his fourth outing on the world stage along with a record seventh major tournament for his country. However, he was not named in Capello's 30-man preliminary squad, with the coach opting instead for Carragher and King among others as potential defensive cover for Ferdinand and Terry.

Style of play
Regarded as one of the best English centre backs of his generation, Campbell was a strong, athletic and imposing defender, with a good positional sense, and was also a strong tackler. Due to his height and physical power, he excelled in the air, both offensively and defensively, although he initially had to work hard to improve his heading ability during his teenage years. He did not possess good natural stamina, but had pace, power, agility and quick feet, as well as significant mental strength. Due to his versatility and range of skills, as well as his ability to carry the ball out of defence and get forward, he was also capable of playing as a right back on occasion. However, despite being fairly comfortable in possession, he frequently drew criticism throughout his career for his poor distribution.

Managerial career
On 30 January 2017, Campbell was named as Dennis Lawrence's assistant manager, after the latter was appointed manager of the Trinidad and Tobago national team.

Macclesfield Town
Campbell was appointed manager of Macclesfield Town on 27 November 2018, then bottom of League Two and five points adrift of safety. Under Campbell, Macclesfield finished 22nd in League Two, three points above the bottom two relegation places. They stayed up on the last day of the season with a 1–1 draw with Cambridge United. He oversaw eight wins and 12 draws in his 30 games in charge. It was announced on 15 August 2019 that Campbell would be leaving the financially troubled club, by mutual agreement. In December 2019, Campbell backed a HM Revenue and Customs bid to wind-up the club, claiming to be owed £180,000.

Southend United
On 22 October 2019, Campbell was appointed manager of EFL League One club Southend United. Campbell watched his new side lose 7–1 to Doncaster Rovers before taking charge for his first game — a 3–1 home defeat to Ipswich Town. On 18 January 2020, Southend won their second game under Campbell with a 2–1 victory away at Accrington Stanley, the club's first league win since September 2019. However, financial constraints prevented Campbell from signing any new players during the January 2020 transfer window. In June 2020, the season was ended early due to the COVID-19 pandemic in England. At the time Southend were second from bottom in League One, 16 points from safety. Following a decision not to restart the season, Southend were relegated to League Two. Campbell left the club on 30 June 2020.

Political views

After his retirement from football, Campbell became increasingly vocal about British politics. In 2013, he said he liked "the mentality of Labour but the policies of the Conservatives". In 2014, he criticised Ed Miliband's proposals for a mansion tax on properties worth over £2 million, calling it "madness". He has also stated he is considering joining the Conservative Party and would be interested in helping the party gain more of "the black vote".

Campbell has criticised the racial diversity in The Football Association ("FA"), and he made newspaper headlines in March 2014 after claiming that institutional racism on the part of the FA meant he was never chosen to captain the England team during his playing career. Campbell had been named as starting captain for England in a friendly against the United States in May 2005 under Sven-Göran Eriksson, he was replaced with Zat Knight at half-time following an ankle injury.

In February 2015, Campbell confirmed his intention to run for the Conservative Party nomination for Mayor of London in the 2016 election. In the list of four candidates chosen in July 2015, Campbell was not shortlisted.

During the 2016 referendum on whether the United Kingdom should remain a member of, or leave, the European Union, Campbell supported Brexit.

Personal life
In 2008, Campbell began dating interior designer Fiona Barratt, the granddaughter of Barratt Homes founder Sir Lawrie Barratt. They married in Corbridge, Northumberland, on 17 July 2010. He has a son from a previous relationship with Janet Tyler.

Campbell had homes in London and at Hallington Hall at Hallington in Northumberland. In December 2015, Hallington Hall was put up for sale for just under £6 million after being totally renovated.

Charitable work
In 2009, Campbell launched his charity "Kids go live" which allows inner city children to see a variety of live sporting events such as Wimbledon, the Olympic Games and rugby internationals.

Career statistics

Club

International

Scores and results list England's goal tally first, score column indicates score after Campbell goal.

Managerial statistics

Honours

Player
Tottenham Hotspur
Football League Cup: 1998–99

Arsenal
Premier League: 2001–02, 2003–04
FA Cup: 2001–02, 2002–03, 2004–05
FA Community Shield: 2002
UEFA Champions League runner-up: 2005–06

Portsmouth
FA Cup: 2007–08

England U19
UEFA European U-18 Championship: 1993

England U21
 Toulon Tournament:  1994

Individual
PFA Team of the Year: 1998–99 Premier League, 2002–03 Premier League, 2003–04 Premier League
FIFA World Cup All-Star Team: 2002
UEFA European Championship Team of the Tournament: 2004

References
General

Specific

External links

Kids go Live – charity founded by Campbell

1974 births
Living people
English people of Jamaican descent
Footballers from Plaistow, Newham
Black British sportsmen
English footballers
Association football defenders
West Ham United F.C. players
Tottenham Hotspur F.C. players
Arsenal F.C. players
Portsmouth F.C. players
Notts County F.C. players
Newcastle United F.C. players
Premier League players
English Football League players
England youth international footballers
England under-21 international footballers
England B international footballers
England international footballers
UEFA Euro 1996 players
1998 FIFA World Cup players
UEFA Euro 2000 players
2002 FIFA World Cup players
UEFA Euro 2004 players
2006 FIFA World Cup players
English football managers
Macclesfield Town F.C. managers
Southend United F.C. managers
English Football League managers
British sportsperson-politicians
Black British politicians
Conservative Party (UK) politicians
FA Cup Final players
British Eurosceptics